Pseudocalamobius filiformis is a species of beetle in the family Cerambycidae. It was described by Fairmaire in 1888.

References

Agapanthiini
Beetles described in 1888